Malir Development Authority was established to oversee the development of Malir in Karachi, Sindh, Pakistan. It was merged with the City District Government Karachi in 2001 but were reinstated after its dissolution.

See also
 Malir Town
 Taiser Town
 Karachi Improvement Trust 
 Karachi Metropolitan Corporation 
 Karachi Municipal Commission 
 Karachi Municipal Committee 
 Karachi Municipal Corporation
 City District Government of Karachi
 Karachi Development Authority
 Lyari Development Authority

References

External links
 Defunct Malir and Lyari development authorities restored after three years - Daily Times

Government of Karachi
Urban development authorities
Government agencies of Sindh